Arthur Holland (26 November 1916 – March 1987) was an English football referee.

Career
Born in Barnsley, Holland became a Football League linesman in 1947 and graduated to the Referees List in 1951, taking charge of the FA Amateur Cup Final in 1959. Later, in the same year he was appointed to the FIFA List and later refereed in the 1963 European Cup Final between Benfica and Milan. He ended his domestic refereeing career with the 1964 FA Cup Final between West Ham United and Preston North End. A few weeks later his final match was the European Nations Cup Final between Spain and the USSR in Madrid.

Outside football, he worked as a miner from 1935 and after his refereeing retirement as a publican, running The Paddy public house in Kendray, Barnsley.

Tournaments
1962–63 European Cup (final)
1963–64 FA Cup (final)
1964 European Nations' Cup (final)

References

External links 
 
 
 

1916 births
1987 deaths
Sportspeople from Barnsley
English football referees
FA Cup Final referees
1964 European Nations' Cup referees
UEFA European Championship final referees